Augeiae or Augeiai (Ancient Greek: Αὐγειαί) may refer to:
Augeiae (Laconia), a town of ancient Laconia, Greece
Augeiae (Locris), a town of ancient Locris, Greece